Alfred Heinrich Ehrlich (5 October 1822, in Vienna – 30 December 1899, in Berlin) was a pianist, composer and writer on music. As a composer, he came forward with a Piano Concerto and Piano Variations on an Original Theme, being one of the first composers to collect Romanian folk melodies.

Life
Ehrlich finished his high school of music under the leadership of Adolf Henselt, Karl Maria von Bocklet and Sigismund Thalberg and composition with Simon Sechter. From 1840 to 1844 he performed in Hungary, Romania and Vienna. In 1848, he became correspondent for the Augsburger Allgemeine Zeitung, pianist of King George V of Hanover in 1852, moving to Wiesbaden in 1855. Two years later he went to England and finally settled in Berlin in 1862. There he acquired an excellent reputation as a piano player of Beethoven's compositions. From 1864 to 1872 he was a piano teacher at the Stern Conservatory. Among his pupils were Franz Mannstädt, Friedrich Spiro and Felix Dreyschock, the critic Paul Marsop and Wilibald Nagel.

In addition to his teaching activities, he was in Berlin a political correspondent for the magazines Nordic bee (Russian newspaper, in 1862 and later), Vossische Zeitung (1867–69) and L'Independence (1867–69). In 1875, he received the title of professor.

Books
In addition to his journalistic work, Ehrlich became a writer and published novels and musical studies, which were very popular in his day, among which are Schlaglichter und Schlagschatten aus der Music Welt (1872),  Wie übt man Klavier? (1879, 2nd edition 1884), Die Music Aesthetik in ihrer Entwickelung von Kant bis auf die Gegenwart (1881),  Aus allen Tonarten (1888), Dreissig Jahre Künstlerleben (1893),  Modernes Musikleben (1895) and other novels.

References

External links
 

19th-century classical composers
1860 births
1906 deaths
German classical pianists
Male classical pianists
German classical composers
Musicians from Leipzig
German male classical composers
19th-century classical pianists
19th-century German composers
German pianists
German male pianists
19th-century German male musicians
Writers about music